Willowdale Township is a township in Dickinson County, Kansas, USA.  As of the 2000 census, its population was 258.

Willowdale Township was organized in 1872.

Geography

Further reading

References

External links
 City-Data.com

Townships in Dickinson County, Kansas
Townships in Kansas